Bagher Ayatollahzadeh Shirazi (born Baqir al-Husayni al-Shirazi; August 23, 1936 – August 19, 2007), was an Iranian professor and architect.

Shirazi was the deputy coordinator at the Iranian Cultural Heritage Organization (ICHO), coordinating and supervising all ICHO activities at a national and international level, establishing executive centers of the organization across all provinces of Iran. He then became the head of the organization, and remained until 2000.

Early life and education 
Shirazi was born in Najaf, Iraq. He hailed from the prominent religious al-Shirazi family. His father was Sayyid Muhammad-Husayn al-Shirazi (d. 1955), the son of grand Ayatollah Mirza Ali Agha al-Shirazi (d. 1936). His mother was the daughter of Sheikh Muhammad-Kadhim al-Shirazi (d. 1948). His eldest brother Razi is a religious jurist. One of his brothers, Mostafa is a doctor in agricultural studies and resides in Oregon.

Education 
Shirazi travelled to Iran often at a young age until he settled in 1955, after his father passed away. He studied at the University of Tehran, earning a bachelors and masters in Architecture. He then went to the University of Rome, and completed his PhD in the Study and Restoration of Historic Monuments.

Works

Books 

 Isfahan in the history.
 Islamic Architecture.
 Iranian Architecture and Urbanism. 5 volumes.

Papers 
Shirazi has produced more than 65 scientific and research papers on architecture, conservation and related topics that have been published in journals and proceedings.

Awards 

 Agha Khan Foundation Award for Architecture for the restoration of the historic monuments in Isfahan, 1980.
 Honored as a Selected Feature of Iranian Architecture and Culture by the Iran Academy of Art, 2001.
 Honored as a Devoted Feature of cultural heritage by Iranian Cultural Heritage Organization, 2003.

See also 

 Iranian architecture
 History of Isfahan
 Mirza Shirazi

References

External links 
List of Journals by Shirazi by Noor Specialized Magazines (in Persian)

 1936 births
2007 deaths
Iranian architects
People from Najaf